Tour Saint-Gobain (previously known as Tour M2) is an office skyscraper designed by Valode & Pistre in Courbevoie, in La Défense, the business district of the Paris metropolitan area.

It houses the head office of the French company Saint-Gobain.

The first stone was laid on 19 April 2017 by Pierre-André de Chalendar, the chairman and CEO of Saint-Gobain, Gabriele Galateri di Genola, the chairman of Generali, and Xavier Huillard, the chairman and CEO of Vinci SA.

See also 
 List of tallest buildings and structures in the Paris region
 List of tallest buildings in France

References

External links 
 Tour Saint-Gobain

Saint-Gobain
La Défense
Office buildings completed in 2019
21st-century architecture in France